Filipe Candido da Trindade (born 18 July 1999) is a Brazilian professional footballer who plays as a midfielder for Goiatuba.

Professional career
Trindade made his professional debut with Goiás in a 4-1 Campeonato Brasileiro Série B loss to Club Athletico Paranaense on 27 October 2019.

References

External links
 

1999 births
Living people
Footballers from Brasília
Brazilian footballers
Association football midfielders
Goiás Esporte Clube players
Campeonato Brasileiro Série A players
Campeonato Brasileiro Série D players
Associação Atlética Aparecidense players